South Serbia of Southern Serbia may refer to:

 For the southern regions of modern Serbia see Southern Serbia (geographical region)
 South Serbia (1919–22), former province, encompassing regions of Raška, Kosovo, Metohija and Vardar Macedonia
 Vardar Banovina, former province (1929–1941), encompassing Vardar Macedonia and southeastern modern Serbia
 Southern and Eastern Serbia, statistical region of Serbia

See also 
 Serbia (disambiguation)
 East Serbia (disambiguation)
 North Serbia (disambiguation)
 West Serbia (disambiguation)